Xikou Township or Sikou Township is a rural township in Chiayi County, Taiwan.

Name
Xikou's former name refers to the confluence of two rivers, which are Huasing River (華興溪) and Sandie River (三疊溪) coming from the northwest and southwest respectively.

History
Han Chinese firstly settled around the area of Xikou Township since more than 200 years ago. In early 1980s, its population peaked at 21,000 but has been declining since then.

Geography
It has a population total of 13,658 and an area of 33.0463 km2. It is the smallest area of any city or township of Chiayi County. The township land is generally well-watered and flat.

Administration
The township consists of 14 villages, which are Bencuo, Chailin, Deisi, Linjiao, Liougou, Meibei, Meinan, Miaolun, Pingding, Sibei, Sidong, Sisi, Youdong and Yousi.

Economy
Agriculture is the predominant industry in the county. Crops include tomatoes and muskmelon. There are only a few factories in the area.

Tourist attractions
 Xikou Township Cultural Life Center

Notable natives
 Jody Chiang, singer

References

External links

 Sikou Township Office

Townships in Chiayi County